The U.S. Department of Justice Civil Rights Division is the institution within the federal government responsible for enforcing federal statutes prohibiting discrimination on the basis of race, sex, disability, religion, and national origin. The Division was established on December 9, 1957, by order of Attorney General William P. Rogers, after the Civil Rights Act of 1957 created the office of Assistant Attorney General for Civil Rights, who has since then headed the division.  The head of the Civil Rights Division is an Assistant Attorney General for Civil Rights (AAG-CR) appointed by the President. Kristen Clarke is the current Assistant Attorney General, the first woman to be confirmed by the Senate for the position.

Organization
 Assistant Attorney General for Civil Rights
 Appellate Section
 Coordination and Review Section 
 Criminal Section 
 Disability Rights Section 
 Educational Opportunities Section 
 Employment Litigation Section 
 Housing and Civil Enforcement Section 
 Immigrant and Employee Rights Section
 Policy & Strategy Section
 Special Litigation Section 
 Voting Section

Jurisdiction
The Division enforces

 the Civil Rights Acts of 1957, 1960, 1964, and 1968
 the Voting Rights Act of 1965, as amended through 2006
 the Equal Credit Opportunity Act of 1974
 the Americans with Disabilities Act of 1990
 the National Voter Registration Act of 1993
 the Matthew Shepard and James Byrd Jr. Hate Crimes Prevention Act of 2009
 the Uniformed and Overseas Citizens Absentee Voting Act of 1986
 the Voting Accessibility for the Elderly and Handicapped Act of 1984
 the Civil Rights of Institutionalized Persons Act of 1980, which authorizes the Attorney General to seek relief for persons confined in public institutions where conditions exist that deprive residents of their constitutional rights
 the Freedom of Access to Clinic Entrances Act of 1994
 the Police Misconduct Provision of the Violent Crime Control and Law Enforcement Act of 1994
 the Religious Land Use and Institutionalized Persons Act of 2000
 the Religious Freedom Restoration Act of 1993
 Section 102 of the Immigration Reform and Control Act of 1986 (IRCA), as amended, which prohibits discrimination on the basis of national origin and citizenship status as well as document abuse and retaliation under the Immigration and Nationality Act of 1952.

In addition, the Division prosecutes actions under several criminal civil rights statutes which were designed to preserve personal liberties and safety.

Assistant Attorneys General

 denotes head that served as acting Assistant Attorney General

References

External links
 

Civil rights movement
Civil rights organizations in the United States
Human rights organizations based in the United States
Government agencies established in 1957
Civil Rights Division